Brandon Nansen (born 3 November 1993) is a New Zealand rugby union player who currently plays as a lock or loose forward for Northampton Saints. Previously Nansen represented North Harbour in New Zealand's provincial rugby tournament and the Blues in Super Rugby, for the Dragons in the Pro14 and for Stade Francais and CA Brive in the French Top14. He has also played internationally for Samoa.

Early life

Nansen attended Sacred Heart College and represented  at under-16 and under-18 level.

Club career

He quickly became a regular in the side and went on to make 9 appearances for them as they lifted the Mitre 10 Cup Championship in 2016 and earned the right to play in the Premiership in 2017.

Solid performances for North Harbour over the course of four seasons culminated in their promotion to the Mitre 10 Cup Premiership, and Nansen was named as a member of the  squad for the 2017 Super Rugby season.

Nansen joined the Welsh regional team the Dragons for the 2018-19 season.

On 3 July 2020, Nansen leaves Dragons to return to France to sign for Brive in the Top 14 for the 2020-21 season.

On 29 May 2021, Nansen moves to England to join Northampton Saints in the Premiership Rugby ahead of the 2021-22 season.

International career 
Nansen was a New Zealand Schoolboys representative in 2011, where he played in a side that featured future All Blacks; Ardie Savea and Patrick Tuipulotu.

Career honours

North Harbour

Mitre 10 Cup Championship – 2016

References

1993 births
Living people
New Zealand rugby union players
Rugby union locks
Rugby union flankers
North Harbour rugby union players
Rugby union players from Auckland
Dragons RFC players
People educated at Sacred Heart College, Auckland
New Zealand expatriate sportspeople in Wales